A vocal school, blab school or ABC school or old-time school was a type of children's primary school at some remote rural places in North America, outdated and obsolete as the 19th century progressed. The school children recited (blabbed) their lessons out loud separately or in chorus with others as a method of learning.

Etymology and word origin 
Blab is the shortened form of the word "blabber", meaning to talk much without making sense.  Middle English had the noun , "one who does not control their tongue".

A blab school was where the school children repeated back their teacher's oral lesson at the top of their voices. The school children vocalized out their lesson in "Chinese fashion" as harmonized voices in unison. In more elegant terms, instead of saying they were blab schools they were referred to as vocal schools.

The neighbors of such a children's school of the 19th century would hear all the noise coming from the school of the children reciting the teacher's lesson aloud, and then dubbed the schools "blab" schools since it sounded like "blab-blab-blab".

Description 
A blab school was popular in frontier days of the American West, since many settlers could not read. These one-room schools were called "old field" schools and were log cabins, many times with just dirt floors. The students sat on wooden backless benches. This type of school was referred to as an "Old-time School" in the Appalachian region of Virginia in the 19th century.

A blab school was basically without books and paper for the students. The schooling consisted of a teacher, with perhaps one or two books, speaking a short oral lesson and the schoolchildren reciting it back with a loud voice several times until memorized. The only requirement needed to become a teacher was to know how to read.

Reciting the information learned was a form of entertainment in frontier days as well as a means of learning. In those days paper was scarce so memorizing was the preferred method over writing things down. The subjects of reading, writing, and arithmetic were the basic ABC items in the 19th century typically learned by the young children reciting out loud the lesson. In blab schools it was typical for a teacher to comment about a child grasping the lesson. This student was referred to as a "leather-head" and was awarded with praise from the teacher.

In many of the "ABC schools" of the United States each pupil was to recite first thing in the morning of the new school day the lesson they learned of their homework assignment of the previous day. The ambitious ones reached the school house by sunrise since they recited in the order of their arrival in the morning. The school rule was "first come, first called" and after a student's recital the teacher called out "Next" as they knew the order of each student's arrival.

The method of reciting one's lesson to memorize it was referred to as "loud studying". Many people of the time believed that listening to one "blabbing" out loud their lesson benefitted the education of the other students. Teachers were not shy in dishing out punishment to those who didn't loudly shout out their lesson.
The teacher would walk around the classroom with a wooden switch or paddle when the students were reciting and use it on the child if the student was not loud enough to the teacher's pleasing.

Abraham Lincoln 

U.S. president Abraham Lincoln learned his ABCs when he attended a vocal school which he walked to in his youth. The school he first attended was at least a mile from his home. His first two teachers were Zachariah Riney and Caleb Hazel, who taught from a windowless schoolhouse. 
Another teacher of Lincoln was Azel Waters Dorsey (1784-1858) who taught him for 6 months in 1824 in a blab school in Spencer County, Indiana.

Lincoln learned first from spelling books. It was customary to learn first to spell all the words of the spelling books and recite several times before advancing to read other books. Lincoln studied Dillworth's Speller and Webster's Old Blueback. Later then he advanced to reading Murray's "English Reader".

Lincoln was noted for shouting out his reading lesson on the path from his home to the blab school and could be heard for a considerable distance. He had the habit of reading anything aloud. Between the ages of 11 and 15, Lincoln went to school occasionally between his obligated home duties. All of Lincoln's schooling combined in various blab schools amounted to less than a year. Many times the blab school Lincoln attended didn't even have a teacher and the older, more advanced students, often teenagers, taught the younger children.

See also 
 Lincoln's New Salem
 Primary education in the United States

Footnotes

Bibliography 

 

School types
Appalachian culture
Midwestern United States